Nadiya Mokhnatska (born October 18, 1995) is a Ukrainian freestyle skier, specializing in  aerials.

Mokhnatska competed at the 2014 Winter Olympics for Ukraine, finishing 17th.

Mokhnatska made her World Cup debut in January 2013. As of January 2015, she has the best result 7th in 2012/13 at Bukovel. Her best World Cup overall finish in aerials is 20th, in 2012/13.

Performances

World Cup

Positions

References

1995 births
Living people
Olympic freestyle skiers of Ukraine
Ukrainian female freestyle skiers
Freestyle skiers at the 2014 Winter Olympics